Sarmīte is a Latvian feminine given name. The associated name day is December 9.

Notable people named Sarmīte
Sarmīte Ēlerte (born 1957), Latvian politician
Sarmīte Ķikuste (born 1962), Latvian politician
Sarmīte Stone (born 1963), Latvian rower

References 

Latvian feminine given names
Feminine given names